Bi-Coastal is the sixth studio album released in 1980 by Australian singer and songwriter Peter Allen.

The album peaked at number 55 in Australia and number 123 on the Billboard 200.

Background
The album is Allen's most successful and was produced by David Foster who also wrote many of its songs. The hit "Fly Away", originally by Japanese artist Mariya Takeuchi, was co-written by Foster and Carole Bayer Sager. The title tune co-written by Foster and Tom Keane features double entendres comparing living on both coasts of the United States to Allen's own bisexuality. The album has become a classic with lovers of west coast pop music not because of the songs but for the use of musicians like Toto, Steve Lukather, Jay Graydon and others.

Track listing
The following listing is for the Australia and New Zealand release. The numbers indicated in the track show the listing for the International release.

Personnel
Peter Allen – piano, keyboards
David Foster – Fender Rhodes (1), synthesizer (1, 5, 8, 9) keyboards (2, 3, 4, 5, 6, 9, 10)
Steve George – backing vocals (1-3, 5-7, 10)
Gary Grant – trumpet
Jay Graydon – guitar, guitar solo (9)
Ed Greene – drums (1, 2, 3)
Larry Hall – trumpet
Gary Herbig – saxophone, sax solo (3)
Jerry Hey – trumpet
Ralph Humphrey – drums (4, 7)
Kim Hutchcroft – trombone
Tom Keane – piano (1), Fender Rhodes (3), synthesizer (1, 5, 8)
Steve Lukather – guitar (1, 3, 5, 9, 10), solo on 10
Dave McDaniels – bass (4)
Eugene Meros – alto saxophone (2)
Richard Page – backing vocals (1-3, 5-7, 10)
Jeff Porcaro – drums (5, 9, 10)
Mike Porcaro – bass (1-3, 5-7, 9, 10)
Lon Price – alto saxophone (4)
Bill Reichenbach Jr. – trombone
Carlos Vega – drums (6)
David Williams – guitar (2)
Larry Williams – saxophone, synthesizer (9)
Richie Zito – guitar (6, 7)
José Rossy- percussion (9, 10)

Charts

References

Peter Allen (musician) albums
1980 albums
Albums produced by David Foster
A&M Records albums
Albums recorded at Sunset Sound Recorders